Lili Gentle (born Lillie Charlene Gentle; March 4, 1940) is a former American film and television actress.

Biography
Born Lillie Charlene Gentle in Montgomery, Alabama, she later changed the spelling of her first name to "Lili". As a child, both she and her sister Janet were stricken with polio.

Gentle made her film debut in an uncredited role in Carousel (1956). In 1956, she had bit parts in Teenage Rebel and The Girl Can't Help It, starring Jayne Mansfield. In 1957, she earned a supporting role opposite Mansfield in Will Success Spoil Rock Hunter?. In 1958, she starred with Tommy Sands in the dramatic-musical, Sing, Boy, Sing. Her last film role was in 1962, in Mr. Hobbs Takes a Vacation.

She frequently acted on television in shows such as The 20th Century Fox Hour (1956); Matinee Theatre (1957);  and Playhouse 90 (1957).

In 1958, just before her 18th birthday, she married future film producer Richard D. Zanuck, then 23 years old, who was then employed in the 20th Century-Fox story department. With Zanuck, she had two children, Virginia (born October 1959), and Janet (born September 1960), through whom she has five grandchildren and two great-grandchildren. She adopted her daughter Virginia's first born child, Laura, in 1988.

After divorcing Zanuck in 1968, Gentle remarried twice; her second marriage, to Thomas P. Richardson, ended in divorce in 1971. She married her third husband, Timothy W. Guerry, in 1975 and remained together 42 years, until his death in 2018.

Filmography

References

1940 births
Living people
Actresses from Birmingham, Alabama
American film actresses
American television actresses
20th-century American actresses
21st-century American women